Braja Mohan Panda (1890-1965) was an educator and poet. He was born in Larambha in the undivided district of Sambalpur, Odisha, India in 1890.

Panda's father was a landlord. After graduating from Presidency College in Calcutta he returned to Larambha. He realised that without the spread of education his area may not developed. Therefore he started a high school in Larambha in 1938, donating his own land for the school site.

In 1964, Panda established Larambha College. Panda devoted his life to these two schools until his death in 1965.

References

1890 births
1965 deaths
20th-century Indian poets
Indian male poets
Poets from Odisha
20th-century Indian male writers